Vuchko Yordanov (1915 – 15 April 1990) was a Bulgarian footballer. He played in 18 matches for the Bulgaria national football team from 1935 to 1947. He was also part of Bulgaria's team for their qualification matches for the 1938 FIFA World Cup.

References

External links
 

1915 births
1990 deaths
Bulgarian footballers
Bulgaria international footballers
Place of birth missing
Association footballers not categorized by position